The 146th New York State Legislature, consisting of the New York State Senate and the New York State Assembly, met from January 3 to May 4, 1923, during the first year of Al Smith's second tenure as Governor of New York, in Albany.

Background
Under the provisions of the New York Constitution of 1894, re-apportioned in 1917, 51 Senators and 150 assemblymen were elected in single-seat districts; senators for a two-year term, assemblymen for a one-year term. The senatorial districts consisted either of one or more entire counties; or a contiguous area within a single county. The counties which were divided into more than one senatorial district were New York (nine districts), Kings (eight), Bronx (three), Erie (three), Monroe (two), Queens (two) and Westchester (two). The Assembly districts were made up of contiguous area, all within the same county.

At this time there were two major political parties: the Republican Party and the Democratic Party. The Socialist Party nominated a fusion ticket with the Farmer–Labor Party. The Prohibition Party and the Socialist Labor Party also nominated tickets.

Elections
The New York state election, 1922, was held on November 7. Ex-Governor Al Smith (Dem.) unseated the incumbent Governor Nathan L. Miller (Rep.); and Mayor of Schenectady George R. Lunn (Dem.) was elected lieutenant governor. The other six statewide elective offices up for election were also carried by the Democrats. The approximate party strength at this election, as expressed by the vote for Governor, was: Democrats 1,398,000; Republicans 1,012,000; Socialists/Farmer-Labor 108,000; Prohibition 10,000; and Socialist Labor 4,000.

No women were elected to the Legislature.

Sessions
The Legislature met for the regular session at the State Capitol in Albany on January 3, 1923; and adjourned on May 4.

H. Edmund Machold (Rep.) was re-elected Speaker.

Jimmy Walker (Dem.) was elected Temporary President of the State Senate.

State Senate

Districts

Members

The asterisk (*) denotes members of the previous Legislature who continued in office as members of this Legislature. Philip M. Kleinfeld, Michael E. Reiburn, Benjamin Antin, Walter W. Westall, Seabury C. Mastick, J. Griswold Webb and Ernest E. Cole changed from the Assembly to the Senate.

Note: For brevity, the chairmanships omit the words "...the Committee on (the)..."

Employees
 Clerk: Dominick F. Mullaney 
 Sergeant-at-Arms: Ralph D. Paoli
 Assistant Sergeant-at-Arms: 
 Principal Doorkeeper: 
 First Assistant Doorkeeper: 
 Stenographer: Michael Degnan

State Assembly

Assemblymen
Note: For brevity, the chairmanships omit the words "...the Committee on (the)..."

Employees
 Clerk: Fred W. Hammond
Postmaster: James H. Underwood

Notes

Sources
 COMMITTEES FOR SENATE NAMED in the Geneva Daily Times, of Geneva, New York, on January 10, 1923
 Members of the New York Assembly (1920s) at Political Graveyard

146
1923 in New York (state)
1923 U.S. legislative sessions